Hyllisia subvariegata is a species of beetle in the family Cerambycidae. It was described by Breuning in 1953.

References

subvariegata
Beetles described in 1953
Taxa named by Stephan von Breuning (entomologist)